Jennifer Howard may refer to:
 Jennifer Howard (actress) (1925–1993), American stage and film actress
 Jennifer Howard (Canadian politician), member of the Legislative Assembly of Manitoba
 Jennifer Howard (Australian politician), member of the Queensland Legislative Assembly